Jesse Marshall Thompson Edge (born 26 February 1995) is a New Zealand football player who plays in the Swedish Division 1 Norra for IFK Berga .

Club career
He made his professional debut in the Eerste Divisie for Achilles '29 on 20 January 2017 in a game against NAC Breda.

He then moved in 2018 to the professional club Zeleziarne Podbrezova in the Slovakian Fortuna Liga.

Edge left Slovakia in August 2019 after he didn't receive his salary. He then returned to the Netherlands and went on a trial with DFS, before signing with the club at the end of the month.

In August 2020, he then joined Swedish amateur club IFK Berga in Division 1 Norra

In January 2022, he then joined Swedish professional club Lunds BK in Division 1 Sodra before moving to IFK Malmo in August until the end of the 2022 season.

Honours

Club
Waikato FC
 NBF Cup runner-up: 2011–12.

Auckland City
 OFC Champions League champion: 2016.
 New Zealand Football Championship runner-up: 2015–16.

International
New Zealand national under-20 football team
 OFC U-20 Championship champion: 2013.

Personal
Jesse is a nephew of former New Zealand international Declan Edge.

References

External links
 
 

1995 births
Sportspeople from Tauranga
Living people
New Zealand expatriate association footballers
New Zealand association footballers
WaiBOP United players
Auckland City FC players
Achilles '29 players
FK Železiarne Podbrezová players
FC Lokomotíva Košice players
L.R. Vicenza players
FC Petržalka players
New Zealand Football Championship players
Eerste Divisie players
Tweede Divisie players
Slovak Super Liga players
2. Liga (Slovakia) players
New Zealand youth international footballers
New Zealand under-20 international footballers
Association football defenders
Expatriate footballers in Italy
Expatriate footballers in the Czech Republic
Expatriate footballers in Slovakia
Expatriate footballers in the Netherlands
New Zealand expatriate sportspeople in Italy
New Zealand expatriate sportspeople in the Czech Republic
New Zealand expatriate sportspeople in Slovakia
New Zealand expatriate sportspeople in the Netherlands